Barh is a town and one of the 6 sub-division of Patna District, Bihar in India. It is located on the southern bank of the Ganges.

Population 
, Barh had a total population of 316,348 residents, with 162,354 males and 153,994 females. Barh had an average literacy rate of 100%.

Administration
The Barh sub-division (Tehsil) is headed by an IAS or state Civil service officer of the rank of Sub-Divisional Magistrate (SDM).

Blocks
The Barh Tehsil is divided into 7 Blocks, each headed by a Block Development Officer (BDO). List of Blocks is as follows:
 Athmalgola
 Mokama
 Belchi
 Ghoswari
 Pandarak
 Bakhtiarpur
 Barh

Politics 
Barh is a part of the Barh Assembly constituency under the Munger Lok Sabha constituency. It is also the oldest subdivision in India.

History

Peace Treaty of Barh 
In 1495, after the sack of Patna, Sikandar Lodi advanced towards Bengal, but a non-aggression pact was made between the Delhi and the Bengal armies. It was decided that the territory to the east of Barh would be controlled by Bengal's ruler, while those to the west would be controlled by the Delhi empire.

Sarai 
During the Mughal period, Barh had a large sarai with 200 rooms for travelers/traders built by Sher Shah Suri.

Rennell's Survey 
In 1776, James Rennell, also called the "Father of Indian Geography", surveyed Bengal and listed prominent destinations.

Barh Railway line 
On 10 November 1877, the Barh railway station was opened to the public.

Plague 
Between the 1890s to 1910, Barh and Patna were afflicted by the plague. It is believed that the 1898 plague came by sea by rats aboard infected ships, though it first appeared in the British India Steam Navigation Company's wharf. The two main factors for the spread of the plague were believed to be the high presence of rats and houses with poor hygiene and bad ventilation.

The population of the extended Barh subdivision decreased from 408,256 in 1891 to 365,327 in 1901 due to the plague.

Sati incident 
In 1928, Sampati Kuer, a young widow from Berhna village, committed sati on the funeral pyre of her deceased husband. The British government suspected foul play and sentenced 10 people to prison, including her brother Murlidhar Pande, as sati was outlawed 100 years earlier by the British government.

NTPC Barh 

NTPC Limited is India's largest power-generating company. The former Prime Minister of India, Atal Bihari Vajpayee, laid the foundation stone of the main plant of stage 1 of NTPC Barh Super Thermal Power Station on 6 March 1999.

List of villages
The list of villages in Barh Block (under Barh Tehsil) is as follows:

 Agwanpur
 Berhana East
 Berhana West
 Bhatgawn
 Dhanwan Mobarakpur
 Ekdanga
 Ibrahimpur
 Nadawan
 Naruada
 Rahimpur Rupas
 Rangbigha
 Sarkatti Saidpur
 Shohari
 Achuara

References 

Cities and towns in Patna district
Neighbourhoods in Patna